Sona Masuri (IET No. 7244, BPT 3291, also spelled as Sona Masoori or Sona Mahsuri) is a lightweight and aromatic medium-grain rice which is the result of a cross combination of the rice varieties Sona and Mahsuri. It is grown largely in the Indian states of Andhra Pradesh, Telangana and Karnataka, and used primarily in South Indian cuisine. In Telugu, Sona Masuri rice is called Bangaru Theegalu (meaning Golden Ivy). Sona Masuri is a premium variety of rice that is mainly exported to the United States, Canada, Europe, Australia, Singapore, Malaysia, and Middle Eastern countries such as Saudi Arabia, the United Arab Emirates, and Qatar.

In Andhra Pradesh, it is mainly cultivated in the Krishna, Guntur, Kurnool, Nellore, Prakasham and Twin Godavari districts. In Telangana it is mainly cultivated in Mahabubnagar, Miryalaguda, karimnagar, Nizamabad, and Warangal. In Karnataka, it is mainly cultivated in the Raichur, Koppal and Bellary, Belagavi districts.

References

Rice varieties
Agriculture in Andhra Pradesh
Rice production in India